In the mathematical field of linear algebra, an arrowhead matrix is a square matrix containing zeros in all entries except for the first row, first column, and main diagonal, these entries can be any number. In other words, the matrix has the form

Any symmetric permutation of the arrowhead matrix, where P is a permutation matrix, is a (permuted) arrowhead matrix. Real symmetric arrowhead matrices are used in some algorithms for finding of eigenvalues and eigenvectors.

Real symmetric arrowhead matrices
Let A be a real symmetric (permuted) arrowhead matrix of the form

where  is diagonal matrix of order n−1,

Let

be the eigenvalue decomposition of A, where 

is a diagonal matrix whose diagonal elements are the eigenvalues of A, and

is an orthonormal matrix whose columns are the corresponding eigenvectors. The following holds:

 If  for some i, then the pair , where  is the i-th standard basis vector, is an eigenpair of A. Thus, all such rows and columns can be deleted, leaving the matrix with all .
  The Cauchy interlacing theorem implies that the sorted eigenvalues of A interlace the sorted elements : if  (this can be attained by symmetric permutation of rows and columns without loss of generality), and if s are sorted accordingly, then .

Symmetric arrowhead matrices arise in descriptions of radiationless transitions in isolated molecules and oscillators vibrationally coupled with a Fermi liquid.

Eigenvalues and eigenvectors
The eigenvalues of an irreducible real symmetric arrowhead matrix are the zeros of the secular equation

which can be, for example, computed by the bisection method. The corresponding eigenvectors are equal to 

Direct application of the above formula may yield eigenvectors which are not numerically sufficiently orthogonal. 
The forward stable algorithm which computes each eigenvalue and each component of the corresponding eigenvector to almost full accuracy is described in. The Julia version of the software is available.

Inverses
Let A be an irreducible real symmetric arrowhead matrix. If  for some i, the inverse is a permuted irreducible real symmetric arrowhead matrix:

where

If  for all i, the inverse is a rank-one modification of a diagonal matrix (diagonal-plus-rank-one matrix or DPR1):

where

References

Matrices